Paraliobacillus quinghaiensis is a Gram-positive, endospore-forming, moderately halophilic, rod-shaped and motile bacterium from the genus of Paraliobacillus which has been isolated from sediments from Dabuxun Lake, a high-salinity lake in the Qaidam Basin in China.

References

External links 

Type strain of Paraliobacillus quinghaiensis at BacDive -  the Bacterial Diversity Metadatabase

Bacillaceae
Bacteria described in 2009